There has not been a monarch known as Alphonso or Alfonso I of Spain, the first king of that name of the unified Spain being Alfonso XII (1857–1885). Several precursor kingdoms have had an Alfonso I, including:

Alfonso I of Asturias ( – 757)
Alfonso I of Aragon and Navarre ( – 1134), known as the Battler
Alfonso II of Aragon, also known as Alfons I, Count of Barcelona (1157–1196), called the Chaste or the Troubadour